Evan Hlavacek (born November 27, 1974) is a former American football wide receiver/defensive back most recently playing for the Colorado Crush in the Arena Football League.

He is now a firefighter with the Central Yavapai Fire District in Prescott Valley, Arizona.

College years
Hlavacek graduated from the University of San Diego and was a standout athlete in football, and baseball. In football, he was a three-time All-Pioneer Football League selection.

Professional career
On March 21, 2002, Hlavacek re-signed with the Indiana Firebirds.

References

External links
AFL stats from arenafan.com

1974 births
Living people
Players of American football from San Jose, California
American football wide receivers
American football defensive backs
San Diego Toreros football players
Albany Firebirds players
Indiana Firebirds players
Arizona Rattlers players
Colorado Crush players